Turan Posht (also Romanized as Tūrān Posht; also known as Tarūm Pusht) is a village in Dehshir Rural District, in the Central District of Taft County, Yazd Province, Iran. At the 2006 census, its population was 125, in 58 families.

References 

Populated places in Taft County